The San Diego Film Critics Society (SDFCS) is an organization of film reviewers from San Diego-based publications that was founded in 1997.

Overview

The San Diego Film Critics Society (SDFCS) is composed of print, television, radio and digital film critics working in San Diego County. According to the SDFCS, the mission of the society is to provide diverse critical opinion about movies, advance film education and awareness, and recognize excellence in cinema. The society holds several events each year to benefit local student filmmakers and provides provision of financial assistance for the academic pursuits of young filmmakers. The society also supports Film School Confidential, an annual festival held at the Museum of Photographic Arts in Balboa Park, presenting short films directed and produced by local student filmmakers. The events organized by the society often include screenings of excellent studio and independent films at various locations, many times featuring appearances by directors and actors involved in the film.

SDFCS Award Ceremony

Each year, the society votes on the SDFCS Awards, which recognizes the best cinematic efforts of the year.  This includes recognition of best film, actor, actress, director, cinematographer and numerous other categories. The voting results are published in film-related media worldwide, culminating in an annual awards banquet. Award nominations and winners are typically announced in the second week of December. In addition to the SDFCS Award, the organization presents an annual Career Award, Kyle Counts Award, and Special Award for an outstanding performer from that year. The Kyle Counts Award, named after the late San Diego film critic, recognizes a person or institution who is advancing film awareness, education and entertainment in the county.

Awards

Categories
 Best Actor
 Best Actress
 Best Adapted Screenplay
 Best Animated Film
 Best Cinematography
 Best Director
 Best Documentary Film
 Best Editing
 Best Ensemble
 Best Film
 Best Foreign Language Film
 Best Original Screenplay
 Best Supporting Actor
 Best Supporting Actress
 Best Comedic Performance
 Best Production Design
 Best Original Score
 Best Visual Effects

Award breakdown
(2 and more)
 7 awards:
 Nightcrawler (2014): Best Picture, Director, Original Screenplay, Actor, Supporting Actress, Cinematography and Score
 6 awards:
 Inglourious Basterds (2009): Best Picture, Director, Original Screenplay, Supporting Actor, Ensemble Performance and Score
 Slumdog Millionaire (2008): Best Picture, Director, Adapted Screenplay, Cinematography, Editing, and Score
 4 awards:
 Argo (2012): Best Picture, Director, Adapted Screenplay, Editing
 There Will Be Blood (2007): Best Actor, Director, Adapted Screenplay, and Score
 No Country for Old Men (2007): Best Picture, Supporting Actor, Cast, and Cinematography
 Vera Drake (2004): Best Picture, Actress, Supporting Actor and Original Screenplay
 Ghost World (2001): Best Picture, Actress, Director and Adapted Screenplay
 Almost Famous (2000): Best Picture, Supporting Actress, Director and Original Screenplay
 American Beauty (1999): Best Picture, Actor, Actress and Supporting Actress
 3 awards:
Leave No Trace (2018): Best Picture, Best Director and Breakthrough Artist
Capote (2005): Best Actor, Director and Adapted Screenplay
Thirteen Conversations About One Thing (2002): Best Director, Original Screenplay and Editing
 2 awards:
A Single Man (2009): Best Actor and Score
 The Wrestler (2008): Best Actor and Supporting Actress
 Eternal Sunshine of the Spotless Mind (2004): Best Actor and Editing
 Million Dollar Baby (2004): Best Director and Original Score
 Dirty Pretty Things (2003): Best Picture and Actor
 The Lord of the Rings: The Return of the King (2003): Best Director and Production Design
 Far from Heaven (2002): Best Picture and Actress
 Gladiator (2000): Best Actor and Cinematography
 Harry Potter and the Deathly Hallows – Part 2 (2011): Best Ensemble and Score
 The Perks of Being a Wallflower (2012): Best Supporting Actress and Ensemble
 Baby Driver (2017): Best Editing and Use of Music
 Get Out (2017): Best Picture and Original Screenplay
 Lady Bird (2017): Best Director and Supporting Actress
The Favourite (2018): Best Costume Design and Best Production Design
Game Night (2018): Best Editing and Best Ensemble
Everything Everywhere All At Once (2022): Best Director and Best Editing

Award ceremonies
 1996: 1st San Diego Film Critics Society Awards
 1997: 2nd San Diego Film Critics Society Awards
 1998: 3rd San Diego Film Critics Society Awards
 1999: 4th San Diego Film Critics Society Awards
 2000: 5th San Diego Film Critics Society Awards
 2001: 6th San Diego Film Critics Society Awards
 2002: 7th San Diego Film Critics Society Awards
 2003: 8th San Diego Film Critics Society Awards
 2004: 9th San Diego Film Critics Society Awards
 2005: 10th San Diego Film Critics Society Awards
 2006: 11th San Diego Film Critics Society Awards
 2007: 12th San Diego Film Critics Society Awards
 2008: 13th San Diego Film Critics Society Awards
 2009: 14th San Diego Film Critics Society Awards
 2010: 15th San Diego Film Critics Society Awards
 2011: 16th San Diego Film Critics Society Awards
 2012: 17th San Diego Film Critics Society Awards
 2013: 18th San Diego Film Critics Society Awards
 2014: 19th San Diego Film Critics Society Awards
 2015: 20th San Diego Film Critics Society Awards
 2016: 21st San Diego Film Critics Society Awards
 2017: 22nd San Diego Film Critics Society Awards
 2018: 23rd San Diego Film Critics Society Awards
 2019: 24th San Diego Film Critics Society Awards
 2020: 25th San Diego Film Critics Society Awards
 2021: 26th San Diego Film Critics Society Awards
 2022: 27th San Diego Film Critics Society Awards

See also
 List of film awards

References

External links

 
American film critics associations
Cinema of Southern California
Arts organizations based in California
Culture of San Diego
Mass media in San Diego
Organizations based in San Diego